Two ships in the United States Navy have been named USS Forrest Sherman for Admiral Forrest Sherman.
 
  was the lead ship of her class and served from 1955 to 1982.
  is an  commissioned 28 January 2006.

United States Navy ship names